Parfums Givenchy is a French brand of perfumes and cosmetics, known for fragrances L'Interdit, Amarige, Organza, Pi, and Givenchy III. As part of Givenchy, it has been a subsidiary of LVMH since 1988.

Presentation 
The Givenchy perfume brand belongs to the LVMH luxury group since 1987. It has two factories in France. A perfume production plant (50%) and cosmetics (50%) located in Beauvais in the Oise (about 400 employees) opened in 1968 and a perfume plant located in Vervins in the Aisne (about 250 employees) in 1995.

History
Givenchy was founded in 1952 by designer Hubert de Givenchy, who retired in 1995. Known first for his haute couture work, Givenchy founded Les Parfums Givenchy in 1957.
In 1958, Hubert de Givenchy asked his friend Audrey Hepburn to be the face of his parfume, L'Interdit, which only she was allowed to wear for a full year. He created a revolution in using, for the first time, a movie star on an advertising campaign.

Monsieur de Givenchy and l'Eau de Vetiver were launched in 1957 and 1959, respectively, followed in 1970 by the launch of the female fragrance Givenchy III with the slogan "Who knows why one is reminded of a particular woman and not another one? Givenchy III gives memories to men." The success of Parfums Givenchy led to the construction of a factory in Beauvais.

Famous patrons include the Guinness, Grimaldi and Kennedy families, who famously wore Givenchy clothes to the funeral of John F. Kennedy.

Hubert de Givenchy created the “4G” logo for the brand and a cosmetic line launched in the United States.

Some of Givenchy's successful fragrances include Ysatis, Amarige, Organza, Very Irresistible, Ange ou Démon, Dahlia noir (2011) for women, and Monsieur de Givenchy (first fragrance for men, 1959), Gentleman, Pi, Givenchy pour Homme, Vetyver and Play for men.

In May 2019, a first-ever pop-up Givenchy beauty suite opened its doors to the visitors of the 2019 Cannes Film Festival, where the guests of the Cannes Film Festival could get their Givenchy makeover ahead of the red carpet premiere. This was part of an effort to revitalize the cosmetics line.

The perfumes 
In 2000, in order to contribute to the revival of the brand, Parfums Givenchy appointed designer Pablo Reinoso as artistic director of the company. The stylist Riccardo Tisci, artistic director of the Givenchy house from 2005 to 2017, participated in the creations of Givenchy perfumes following the departure of Reinoso from the group in 2006. Since May 2017, artistic direction has been provided by Clare Waight Keller, until in April 2020.

 L'interdit de Givenchy, 1957
 Le De, 1957
 Monsieur, 1959
 Givenchy III, 1970
 Gentleman, 1974

 Eau de Givenchy, 1980
 Ysatis, 1984
 Amarige, 1991
 Insensé, 1993
 Organza, 1996
 Pi, 1998

 Hot Couture, 2000
 Very Irresistible, 2003
 Absolutely Givenchy, 2006

 Ange ou Démon, 2006
 Absolutely Irresistible, 2008
 Play, 2008

 Ange ou Démon Le Secret, 2009
 Play for Her, 2010
 Very Irrésistble Intense, 2011

 Dahlia Noir, 2011
 Dahlia Divin, 2014
 Live Irresistible, 2015
 L'Interdit, 2018
 Irresistible Givenchy, 2020

References

External links
 

Perfume houses
French brands
Luxury brands
Companies based in Paris
Chemical companies established in 1957
French companies established in 1957
LVMH brands
Taffin de Givenchy family